The Taipei Municipal Baseball Stadium was a baseball park located in the Songshan District of Taipei, Taiwan. It was opened in 1959, and hosted numerous major baseball games over the years, including the CPBL's first game in 1990 between Uni-President Lions and Brother Elephants. During its professional years, the stadium was frequently taken as the home stadium of Brother Elephants, Wei Chuan Dragons, and Mercuries Tigers. It was closed and demolished in 2000. Its site is currently occupied by the Taipei Arena. Its role in professional baseball was filled by Tianmu Baseball Stadium across town and Xinzhuang Baseball Stadium in nearby Taipei County (now New Taipei City).

See also
Chinese Professional Baseball League

References

1959 establishments in Taiwan
2000 disestablishments in Taiwan
Baseball venues in Taiwan
Former buildings and structures in Taiwan
History of Taipei
Sports venues demolished in 2000